Soul Mates is an album by saxophonists Charlie Rouse and Sahib Shihab which was recorded in 1988 and released on the Uptown label in 1993.

Reception

The AllMusic review by Scott Yanow called it an "exciting studio date" and stated: "On a sad note, by the time this Uptown CD was finally released in 1993, Rouse, Shihab, and Davis had all passed away".

Track listing
 "November Afternoon"  (Tom McIntosh) – 5:49
 "Green Chimneys" (Thelonious Monk) – 5:12
 "Prayer Song" (Ray Bryant) – 5:42
 "So Nice" (Elmo Hope) – 5:10
 "Soul Mates" (Mal Waldron) – 6:08
 "Bohemia After Dark (Oscar Pettiford) – 5:41
 "Soft Shoulder (Lonnie Hillyer) – 6:02
 "I'm Never Happy"  (Tadd Dameron) – 7:45
 "DiDa" (Sahib Shihab) – 4:54
 "Bittersweet" (Mike Corda) – 5:29
 "Bird's Nest"  (Charlie Rouse) – 4:29

Personnel
Charlie Rouse - tenor saxophone
Sahib Shihab – baritone saxophone
Claudio Roditi – trumpet, flugelhorn
Walter Davis Jr. – piano
Santi Debriano – bass
Victor Lewis – drums
Don Sickler – arranger

References

Uptown Records (jazz) albums
Sahib Shihab albums
Charlie Rouse albums
1993 albums
Albums recorded at Van Gelder Studio